Dzsenifer Marozsán (born 18 April 1992) is a professional footballer who plays as a midfielder for French club Olympique Lyonnais and the Germany national team. She previously played for 1. FC Saarbrücken and 1. FFC Frankfurt in the German Frauen Bundesliga. Born in Hungary, she represented Germany at international level.

At the 2016 Olympics in Rio de Janeiro, Marozsán led unified Germany to its first-ever Olympic gold medal in football, four decades after the East German men won in 1976. In 2015, her cross to Mandy Islacker in stoppage time resulted in a UEFA Women's Champions League win for 1. FFC Frankfurt. She scored the game-winning goal during the UEFA Women's Euro 2013 semifinal against Sweden helping Germany win the title.

Early life
Born in Budapest, Hungary, Marozsán moved with her family to Germany in 1996, after her father János Marozsán, a four-time Hungarian football national, had signed a contract with 1. FC Saarbrücken. She began her career at DJK Burbach, where she played for a boys' team. She then joined the youth department of 1. FC Saarbrücken. The DFB pushed for naturalizing her so she could play for Germany. In fact her whole family was naturalized, because she was still under-aged.

Club career

1. FC Saarbrücken, 2007–2009
In 2007 at the age of 14 years and 7 months, Marozsán became the youngest player to play in the German Bundesliga when she made her debut for 1. FC Saarbrücken. She also holds the record as the Bundesliga's youngest goal scorer at 15 years and 4 months.

1. FFC Frankfurt, 2009–2016

Marozsán signed with 1. FFC Frankfurt in 2009. 
During her time with the club, Frankfurt managed two second-place finishes, coming in the 2010-2011 and 2013-2014 seasons.

She reached her first ever UWCL final in 2012, where Frankfurt were defeated 2–0 by her future club, Lyon. During the 2014–2015 season, she played and scored in each knockout round of the UWCL on the road to the final. In the final against PSG, she played all ninety minutes and sent in the assist to substitute Mandy Islacker that won them the match in extra time. With this win, she earned her first UWCL title and Frankfurt's fourth. She ended up as top assister of the tournament with 8 assists and was named to the team of the tournament by UEFA.

In her final season with Frankfurt, they finished third in the Bundesliga table, disqualifying them from UWCL competition for the coming season.

Olympique Lyonnais, 2016–present
In July 2016, Marozsán signed with Olympique Lyonnais from 1. FFC Frankfurt.

On the 12th of April 2022 she suffered a right knee ACL rupture, which ruled her out of 2022 UWCL Final and UEFA Women's Euro 2022.

International career

Marozsán made her debut for the senior national team on 28 October 2010 in a match against Australia. Her first goal for the senior national team came on 15 February 2012 in a match against Turkey.

In 2013, Germany coach Silvia Neid named her to the Germany squad for the 2013 UEFA Women's Euro competition. In the semifinal of the tournament, she scored a goal versus Sweden, a weak shot from outside the box that slowly found its way to the back of the net. The goal was enough to send them to the final against Norway, where she started the match behind striker Célia Okoyino da Mbabi. Germany won the final thanks to two Nadine Angerer penalty saves and a close-range Anja Mittag shot, giving Marozsán her first major international title. Marozsán was named to the UEFA team of the tournament for her performances throughout the competition.

She scored the deciding goal in the 2016 Olympic Final, leading Germany to their first-ever women's football Olympic gold medal.

She was named captain of the German team on 21 October 2016.

On 22 September 2020, Marozsán played her 100th match for Germany in a 3–0 win against Montenegro during the UEFA Women's Euro 2021 qualifying.

In March 2023, she announced her retirement from international football.

Career statistics

Scores and results list Germany's goal tally first, score column indicates score after each Marozsán goal.

Personal life
Marozsán had pulmonary embolism in July 2018. Three months later, she returned to playing football.

Honours
1. FC Saarbrücken
2. Bundesliga: 2008–09
German Cup runner-up: 2007–08

FFC Frankfurt
UEFA Women's Champions League: 2014–15; runner-up: 2011–12
DFB Pokal: 2010–2011, 2013–2014

Olympique Lyonnais
Division 1 Féminine: 2016–17, 2017–18, 2018–19, 2019–20
Coupe de France féminine: 2016–17, 2018–19, 2019–20
UEFA Women's Champions League: 2016–17, 2017–18, 2018–19, 2019–20

Germany
UEFA Women's Championship: 2013
Summer Olympic Games gold medal: 2016
Algarve Cup: 2012, 2014

Germany U20
FIFA U-20 Women's World Cup: 2010

Germany U17
UEFA Women's U-17 Championship: 2008

Individual
FIFA U-17 Women's World Cup Silver Ball: 2008
FIFA U-17 Women's World Cup Golden Shoe: 2008
UEFA Women's U-17 Championship top scorer: 2008
Fritz Walter Medal bronze medal: 2009
FIFA U-20 Women's World Cup Golden Ball: 2012
UEFA Women's Championship All-Star Team: 2013
Algarve Cup Most Valuable Player: 2014
UEFA Best Women's Player in Europe Award third place: 2015, 2016, 2017
FIFA Women's World Player of the Year nominee: 2016
IFFHS World's Best Woman Playmaker: 2016, 2020
IFFHS Women's World Team: 2017, 2018, 2019, 2020
FIFPro: FIFA FIFPro World XI 2016
UNFP Female Player of the Year: 2016–17, 2017–18, 2018–19
 Division 1 Féminine XI of the Year: 2016–17
 Women's Footballer of the Year in Germany: 2017, 2018, 2019
 UEFA Champions League Midfielder of the Season: 2019–20
 IFFHS World's Best Woman Playmaker of the Decade 2011–2020
 IFFHS UEFA Best Woman Player of the Decade 2011–2020
 IFFHS World's Woman Team of the Decade 2011–2020
 IFFHS UEFA Woman Team of the Decade 2011–2020

References

External links

 
 
 
 National team profile at DFB 
 Player German domestic football stats at DFB 
 
 
 

1992 births
Living people
German women's footballers
German expatriate sportspeople in France
Expatriate women's footballers in France
1. FC Saarbrücken (women) players
1. FFC Frankfurt players
Olympique Lyonnais Féminin players
Hungarian emigrants to Germany
Naturalized citizens of Germany
Germany women's international footballers
2015 FIFA Women's World Cup players
Footballers from Budapest
Women's association football midfielders
Footballers at the 2016 Summer Olympics
Medalists at the 2016 Summer Olympics
Olympic medalists in football
Olympic gold medalists for Germany
German expatriate women's footballers
Frauen-Bundesliga players
Division 1 Féminine players
Olympic footballers of Germany
UEFA Women's Championship-winning players
2019 FIFA Women's World Cup players
German people of Hungarian descent
FIFA Century Club
National Women's Soccer League players
UEFA Women's Euro 2017 players